The Wisconsin Badgers Crew is the rowing team that represents the University of Wisconsin–Madison.  Rowing at the University dates back to 1874.  
The women's openweight team is an NCAA Division I team. The men's and lightweight women's programs compete at the Intercollegiate Rowing Association (IRA) Championship Regatta because the NCAA does not sanction a men's or lightweight women's national championship. Chris Clark has been the men's head coach since 1996 and Bebe Bryans has been the women's head coach since 2004.

History
The first crew is believed to have set out on Lake Mendota in 1874, though the only evidence of this is a letter written in 1912 by a Wisconsin alumnus.  By 1878 rowing had become an intramural sport at the university. The Wisconsin freshmen eight won their event's national championship in 1900, the first national championship win for the rowing team. Since then, the Wisconsin crew has won 48 Intercollegiate Rowing Association titles.

The men's varsity eight won its first IRA national championship in 1951, the first of nine such titles. The 1990 win brought an invitation to the Henley Royal Regatta, the fourth visit for Wisconsin.  The Wisconsin varsity eight has placed in the top three spots at the IRA National Championship Regatta 20 times since 1950, an achievement only surpassed by the University of Washington. In 2008, the Badgers' varsity eight won the IRA national championship over second-place Washington by 1.72 seconds, capping off an undefeated season. 

Wisconsin's women first began actively competing the Winter/Spring of 1972 as a club sport. After a winter of conditioning, they unofficially beat the national record, in their very first race.  Fall of that year, they headed to Boston, for The Head of the Charles Regatta, where they took 2nd place. At that time, the National Women’s Rowing Association championship served as the national championship for collegiate boats. The women's varsity eight won the club title in 1975, and was the highest placed collegiate boat in 1976, 1977, and 1978. In 1986, the Wisconsin women won the National Collegiate Championship, which first began in 1981. In 2009 the varsity four were runners-up at the D-1 NCAA championships. This was the highest-ever finish for a Wisconsin boat in the history of the NCAA championships. 

During the 2010 season, the openweight women won the school's first Big Ten Conference rowing championship, held in Laingsburg, Michigan. The team won four of the six events (1st and 2nd novice 8, varsity 4, and second varsity 8) and finished 2nd in the varsity 8 and 3rd in second varsity four.

Location
Wisconsin's three-story boathouse is located on the southern shore of Lake Mendota in Madison, Wisconsin. The Porter Boathouse spans  and was completed in the spring of 2005. It includes a moving water rowing tank for 24 athletes, five boat bays (including one repair bay) with storage for 100 rowing shells, coaches' offices, and locker rooms for each team. The Porter Boathouse was named in recognition of a donation by the Ben and Cheslee Porter Family for over $1 million toward the facility.

The team's first boathouse, located in front of the Red Gym, stood from 1893 through 1968.  The 1967 boathouse, completed in 1967, was located at the site of the current (Porter) boathouse. The 1967 boathouse housed the team's activities until 2003, when construction on the Porter Boathouse began.

Men's varsity coaches
Amos W. Marston - 1894
Andrew M. O'Dea - 1895-1898
Curran C. McConville - 1899
Andrew M. O'Dea - 1900-1906
Edward H. Ten Eyck - 1907-1910
Harry E. "Dad" Vail - 1911-1928
George W. "Mike" Murphy - 1929-1934
Ralph Hunn - 1935-1940
Allen W. Walz - 1941-1942
George A. Rea - 1943
Curt P. Drewes - 1944-1945
Allen W. Walz - 1946
Norm Sonju - 1947-1968
Randal T. "Jabo" Jablonic - 1969-1995
Chris H. Clark - 1996–present

National championships

Men's Varsity Eight
1951, 1959, 1966, 1973, 1974, 1975, 1986, 1990, 2008

Men's Second Varsity Eight
1973, 1974, 1986

Men's Freshman Eight
1900, 1907, 1964, 1972, 1973, 1979, 1983, 1985,

Women's Varsity Eight
1975, 1976, 1977, 1978, 1986

Women's Lightweight Eight
2004, 2005, 2006, 2008, 2009

Women's Lightweight Four
2011, 2012, 2013, 2014, 2016

Women's Lightweight Double
2015

Notable Regatta Results

D1 NCAA championships
Women's Varsity 4 - Runners Up 2009
Women's Second Varsity 8+ - 3rd Place 2006
Women's Varsity 4 - 3rd Place 2010

National Collegiate Rowing Championship
Men's: 1986, 1990

NCAA South/Central regionals
Women's Novice 8+ - 2008
Women's Novice 8+ (Second Place) - 2009
Women's Novice 8+ (First Place)- 2010

Big Ten championship
Women's Second Varsity Eight - 2008
Women's 1st Novice Eight - 2008
Women's 2nd Novice Eight - 2008
Women's 1st Novice Eight - 2009
Women's 2nd Novice Eight - 2009
Women's 2nd Varsity Four - 2009
Women's 2nd Varsity Eight - 2010
Women's 1st Varsity Four - 2010
Women's 1st Novice Eight - 2010
Women's 2nd Novice Eight - 2010
Big Ten Team Champions - 2010
Women's 2nd Novice Eight- 2012

Eastern Sprints
Men's Freshman Eight - 2000
Men's 2nd Freshman Eight - 2000, 2011, 2012, 2013, 2014, 2015
Men's Varsity Eight - 1946, 2002, 2008
Men's 2nd Varsity Eight - 1987, 2001, 2007, 2008, 2012
Men's 3rd Varsity Eight - 2000, 2001, 2002, 2003, 2006, 2009, 2010, 2011

Head of the Charles Regatta
Women's Club Fours - 1998, 2014
Women's Youth Fours - 1992
Women's Lightweight Eight - 2000, 2001, 2009, 2010, 2011
Men's Championship Eight - 1966, 1972, 1973
Men's Championship Four - 2009, 2011
Women's Championship Eight - 1977, 1978, 1979, 1988

Midwest Rowing Championship
Men's Varsity Eight - 1973-1980, 1983–2006

American Heritage Regatta
Men's Collegiate Eight - 2007
Men's Novice Eight - 2007
Men's Novice Four w/coxswain - 2007

Cups and trophies

Cochrane Cup
1963, 1964, 1967, 1969, 1971, 1973–1977, 1980, 1981, 1984–1991, 1996, 1998–2000, 2002, 2008

Walsh Cup
1967-1969, 1985–1989, 1997–2002, 2008

Ten Eyck Trophy
1972-1975, 1979, 1980, 1986–1988, 1997, 1999–2002

References

External links
 WiscoRowingHistory.org — Wisconsin Rowing History
 UWBadgers.com — UW Men's Crew official site

Rowing clubs in the United States